Kighal (also Romanized as Kīghāl; also known as Keqāl, Kīfāl, Kīqāl, and Kīqāl) is a village in Bakrabad Rural District, in the Central District of Varzaqan County, East Azerbaijan Province, Iran. At the 2006 census, its population was 537, in 125 families.

References 

Towns and villages in Varzaqan County